The 1945–46 Hong Kong First Division League season was the 35th since its establishment. It was the first season of the league following the conclusion of the Japanese occupation of Hong Kong during World War II.

Overview
Royal Air Force won the title.

References
RSSSF

Hong Kong First Division League seasons
Hong
football